The 1943 Texas Tech Red Raiders football team represented Texas Technological College—now known as Texas Tech University—as an independent during the 1942 college football season. Led third-year head coach Dell Morgan, the Red Raiders compiled a record of 4–6. The team played home games at Tech Field in Lubbock, Texas.

Schedule

References

Texas Tech
Texas Tech Red Raiders football seasons
Texas Tech Red Raiders football